2nd Military Intelligence Battalion is a unit of the United States Army which specializes in the acquisition of signals information in direct support of the 66th Military Intelligence Brigade. The 2nd MI Battalion currently is headquartered at Wiesbaden Army Airfield in Germany.

History
There are conflicting reports of the history of the 2nd Military Intelligence Battalion. According to the current 2nd M.I. website, the unit was constituted on 15 February 1952 in the Regular Army as the 2nd Military Intelligence Service Battalion and activated on 1 March 1952 in Austria. 2nd M.I. was reorganized and redesignated 25 May 1954 as the 2nd Military Intelligence Battalion and was subsequently inactivated on 8 September 1955 in Austria.

The official website claims that on 16 September 1980, 2nd M.I. was reactivated and redesignated as Headquarters, Headquarters and Operations Company, 2nd Military Intelligence Battalion, and assigned to the 3rd Armored Division. However, there was a Headquarters and Headquarters Company (HHC) 2nd M.I., located in Pirmasens, Husterhoeh Kaserne in the 1970s. HHC was active at least from 1977, through 1979 at this location. 2nd M.I. subsequently was redesignated and reorganized 26 January 2001 in Darmstadt, Germany, subordinate to the 66th Military Intelligence Brigade. 2nd M.I. then was relocated to Wiesbaden, Germany in November 2008.

The U.S. Army Center of Military History's official lineage of military intelligence publication (hosted on Fort Huachuca's official website) states that 2nd M.I. was constituted 18 October 1961 in the Regular Army as the 2nd Air Reconnaissance Support Battalion and activated on 15 November 1961 in Germany. On 16 September 1962, the battalion was converted and redesignated as the 2nd Military Intelligence Battalion. Other sources report that in or after October 1982, 2nd M.I.'s assets were split up and 2nd M.I. was reassigned to the 207th Military Intelligence Brigade, VII Corps and stationed in Echterdingen in Baden-Württemberg in the Federal Republic of Germany. The unit participated in Operation Desert Storm as part of VII Corps. Following the Cold War, 2nd M.I was inactivated on 15 November 1991 in Germany.

Coat of arms
The coast of arms is a shield: Per chevron abased azure and argent, a chief dancetty of two enhanced of the last the apexes surmounted by two rounders of the first counterchanged and in base a sphinx rampant sable armed gules.

The motto is Oculi Cultus Secreti ("The Eyes of The Secret Cult"). The colors of white and teal blue, symbolize the battalion's former status as an unassigned-to-branch unit. The battalion's numerical designation and mission are suggested by the two rounders or lenses directing their gaze downward. The sphinx is representative of the intelligence mission. Black alludes to the coat of arms of the old Rhineland district of Pfalz in Germany, where the unit was activated.

Military campaigns
2nd M.I. participated in the defense of Saudi Arabia, the liberation and defense of Kuwait and cease-fire campaigns during the Gulf War. It was decorated with a Meritorious Unit Commendation (Army), Streamer, embroidered Southwest Asia.

References

001